State achievement tests in the United States are standardized tests required in American public schools in order for the schools to receive federal funding, according to the Elementary and Secondary Education Act of 1965, in US Public Law 107-110, and the No Child Left Behind Act of 2001.

Tests by state 
The following standardized tests are designed and/or administered by state education agencies and/or local school districts in order to measure academic achievement across multiple grade levels in elementary, middle and senior high school, as well as for high school graduation examinations to measure proficiency for high school graduation. Nebraska is the only state that does not have a standardized test.

Additional tests
In addition to the following list some states administer other required examinations. They include Nevada, which administers several tests as part of the Nevada Proficiency Examination Program. They include the High School Proficiency Examination for Reading and Mathematics; the Iowa Test of Basic Skills; Iowa Tests of Educational Development; Criterion-referenced tests in Reading, Mathematics, and Science; Language Proficiency Assessment; Nevada Alternate Scales of Academic Achievement; and National Assessment of Educational Progress. The Prairie State Achievement Exam is used in Illinois, along with the  Illinois State Achievement Test. Alabama requires the Stanford Achievement Test Series; and in Texas, the Texas Higher Education Assessment. That state has discontinued its usage of the Texas Assessment of Academic Skills. Since the 2007–08 school year, Kentucky has required that all students at public high schools take the ACT in their junior year.

See also
Adequate Yearly Progress
Standardized test
List of admissions tests
Standards-based assessment

References

 
Education reform
Standards-based education
Standardized tests
Secondary education-related lists